James J. Kriegsmann (1 January 1909 – 29 April 1994) was a celebrity and theatrical photographer who worked from 1929 to the 1980s.

Early life and education
Kriegsmann was born on 1 January 1909, in Sadagóra, Bukowina, Austria, the eldest of four children (Rose, b. 1909; Etelka, b. 1911; and Josef b. 1913). He studied classical violin and mandolin as an adolescent, and moved to Vienna as a teenager in pursuit of apprenticeships in portrait photography, eventually receiving a journeyman's license in studio photography from the Photographers Guild of Vienna, just as the Aryanization of photographic studios began across Vienna, resulting in many of Europe's most renowned Jewish photographers living in exile. Facing rising anti-Semitism and no career prospects as a photographer in Vienna, as well as the death of his mother Fannie Kriegsman (née Koerner), Kriegsmann and his siblings left for New York via Hamburg on the S.S. St Louis on 20 September 1929, with little to no ability to speak English.

"his talents put him in a class with three of the most prominent celebrity shutterbugs in America at that time, including Tony Bruno, a Hollywood photographer who moved to New York and set up shop in Carnegie Hall; Maurice Seymour, who was actually two brothers named Maurice Zeldman and Seymour Zeldman, both based in Chicago, one of which would formally change his name to Maurice Seymour and later work for Kriegsmann in his New York Studio; and the legendary George Hurrell, who took classic portraits of stars like Joan Crawford, Jean Harlow and Marlene Dietrich during Hollywood’s golden era."  —The New York Times, 2010

Career

Photography
Following years of work at the Strand Studio on Broadway, he opened his New York City studio in 1933 on the fourth floor of the Actors Equity Building at 165 West 46th Street, later moving to the ground floor and basement with ample room for large studio, dark rooms and reproduction labs. James J. Kriegsmann was famous for his portraits and publicity shots of celebrities from the 1930s thru the 1960s. Kriegsmann's first celebrity photographs were taken when the famous aerialist family the Flying Wallendas visited the Strand Studio where he was employed, and he was the only employee able to speak with them in their own language. Karl Wallenda and Kriegsmann would become lifelong friends.

Kriegsmann photographed many Motown notables, as well as Bill "Mr. Bojangles" Robinson, Glenn Miller, Florence Ballard, Cab Calloway, Frank Sinatra (also with daughter Nancy on his knee), Ray Conniff, Bill Haley, Sid Caesar, Benny Goodman, Ray Charles, Martha Raye, Doris Day, Milton Berle, Duke Ellington, Smokey Robinson and the Miracles, "Little" Stevie Wonder, Tom & Jerry (later Simon and Garfunkel), Gladys Knight & the Pips, Diana Ross and the Supremes, Marvin Gaye, the Four Tops, the Monitors, Edwin Starr, the Originals, Tammi Terrell and hundreds more.

His studio occupied a former Hungarian restaurant in the first floor of the Actors’ Equity Building at 165 West 46th Street, New York City, and operated for over 60 years in partnership with his two sons, noted photographers James J. Kriegsmann Jr. and Thomas O. Kriegsmann. In its time the studio was the largest headshot photography studio in the world.

Kriegsmann became the official in-house photographer for Harlem's Cotton Club, and he was considered among the best photographers in America, who at that time included Murray Korman, one of Broadway's most prolific photographers; Tony Bruno, a Hollywood photographer who relocated to New York City and worked from his studio in Carnegie Hall; Chicago's Maurice Seymour (brothers Maurice and Seymour Zeldman) who eventually joined Kriegsmann in New York and photographed alongside him for many years; and the legendary George Hurrell of Hollywood.

“If you look at the [Kriegsmann Studios] clientele over the years, it’s obvious that the black community thought very highly of [James J. Kriegsmann] as a person, and as a professional, way back then," Mr. Lee said. "The thinking among them was probably, ‘Hey, this cat is cool, let him take your picture, spread the word.’ ”

Kriegsmann's photographs of Florence Ballard, Mary Wilson and Diana Ross of the Supremes are amongst his most accomplished. "He was the Supremes' number one photographer," Mary Wilson declared, "and he created some of our most iconic images." 

Slide Hampton, 78, a two-time Grammy-winning trombonist who once had his picture taken in the old Times Square studio, said of Kriegsmann: “What he did for black entertainers was very noble. After all these years, the fact that some black stars are still working with his son as a way of paying homage to his father is just as noble.”
A number of Kriegsmann's photographs can be seen on display in the galleries of the Hebrew Home for the Aged in Bronx, NY.

Music
In addition to his work as a photographer to the stars, Kriegsmann wrote hundreds of songs for top recording artists of the day, including the hit "The Happy Organ" for Dave "Baby" Cortez, which was the first instrumental song to reach number one on the Top 100 Billboard charts, in 1959, and has been featured in many films.

Personal life 

In 1940, Kriegsmann hired Brooklyn-born Eugenie "Genie" Conran, a beautiful young woman of 17, who, along with a number of other glamorous and older women, had responded to an ad for a receptionist for his studio. She worked at that position until the studio's closing in 1988. They were married on 2 October 1940, when she was 18, and had three sons, photographers James J. Kriegsmann, Jr. (b. 1942) and Thomas O. Kriegsmann (b. 1948) who took over as photographers at Kriegsmann Studios in the late 60's as the studio extended its reach to encompass headshots, commercial photography and reproduction services, becoming the leading photographic lab in New York City, and Eugene Kriegsmann (b. 1944) of Seattle. They lived in Forest Hills Gardens in Forest Hills, Queens.

References

External links 
Soul singer Dee Dee Warwick dies in NJ at age 63
Tammy Wynette: Tragic Country Queen  By Jimmy McDonough
American Photographer, Volume 21 CBS Publications, 1988
 https://www.discogs.com/artist/2742059-James-Kriegsmann-Jr
 http://www.murraykorman.com

1909 births
1994 deaths
20th-century American photographers
Jazz photographers
Austrian emigrants to the United States
Theatrical photographers